A lord-lieutenant is the British monarch's personal representative in each lieutenancy area of the United Kingdom. Historically, each lieutenant was responsible for organising the county's militia. Lord-lieutenant is now an honorary titular position usually awarded to a retired notable person in the county.

England

Avon (from 1974 until 1996)
Bedfordshire
Berkshire
Berwick-upon-Tweed (until 1974) – held jointly with Northumberland 1882–1974
Bristol (until 1974 and from 1996) – held jointly with Gloucestershire 1882–1974
Buckinghamshire
Cambridgeshire
Canterbury (until 1974) – held jointly with Kent 1872–1974
Cheshire
Chester (until 1974) – held jointly with Cheshire 1882–1974
Cinque Ports (until 1889)
City of London – held in Commission, headed by the Lord Mayor
Cleveland (from 1974 until 1996)
Cornwall
Cumberland (until 1974)
Cumbria (from 1974)
Derbyshire
Devon
Dorset
Durham
East Riding of Yorkshire (Restoration until 1974 and from 1996)
East Sussex (from 1974)
Essex
Exeter (until 1974) – held jointly with Devon 1882–1974
Gloucestershire
Gloucester (until 1974) – held jointly with Gloucestershire 1882–1974
Greater London (from 1965)
Greater Manchester (from 1974)
Hampshire
Herefordshire (until 1974 and from 1998)
Hereford and Worcester (from 1974 until 1998)
Hertfordshire (Lord Lieutenant of Hertfordshire Website)
Humberside (from 1974 until 1996)
Huntingdon and Peterborough (from 1965 until 1974)
Huntingdonshire (until 1965)
Isle of Ely (until c. 16th)
Isle of Wight (from 1974)
Kent
Kingston-upon-Hull (until 1974) – held jointly with East Riding of Yorkshire 1882–1974
Lancashire
Leicestershire
Lichfield (until 1974) – held jointly with Staffordshire 1882–1974
Lincolnshire
Lincoln (until 1974) – held jointly with Lincolnshire 1882–1974
County of London (from 1889 until 1965)
Merseyside (from 1974)
Middlesex (until 1965)
Newcastle upon Tyne (until 1974) – held jointly with Northumberland 1882–1974
Norfolk
Norwich (until 1974) – held jointly with Norfolk 1882–1974
Northamptonshire
Northumberland
Nottinghamshire
Nottingham (until 1974) – held jointly with Nottinghamshire 1882–1974
North Riding of Yorkshire (Restoration until 1974)
North Yorkshire (from 1974)
Oxfordshire
Poole (until 1974) – held jointly with Dorset 1882–1974
Rutland (until 1974 and from 1997)
Shropshire
Somerset
Southampton (until 1974) – held jointly with Hampshire 1882–1974
South Yorkshire (from 1974)
Staffordshire
Suffolk
Surrey
Sussex (until 1974)
Tower Hamlets (until 1889)
Tyne and Wear (from 1974)
Warwickshire
Westmorland (until 1974)
West Midlands (from 1974)
West Riding of Yorkshire (Restoration until 1974)
West Sussex (from 1974)
West Yorkshire (from 1974)
Wiltshire
Worcestershire (until 1974 and from 1998)
Worcester (until 1974) – held jointly with Worcestershire 1882–1974
Yorkshire (until Restoration)
York (until 1974) – held jointly with West Riding of Yorkshire 1882–1974

Scotland
Aberdeen (from 1900)
Aberdeenshire
Angus
Argyll and Bute (from 1975)
Argyllshire (until 1975)
Ayrshire (until 1975)
Ayrshire and Arran (from 1975)
Banffshire
Berwickshire
Buteshire (until 1975)
Caithness
Clackmannanshire
Cromarty (until 1890)
Dumfries
Dunbartonshire
Dundee (from 1894)
East Lothian (from 1921)
Edinburgh (known as the "Lord Lieutenant of the City and  County of the City of Edinburgh, and the Liberties thereof" until 1975)
Edinburghshire – renamed Midlothian 1921
Elginshire – renamed Moray 1928
Fife
Forfarshire – renamed Angus 1928
Glasgow (from 1893)
Haddingtonshire – renamed East Lothian 1921
Inverness
Kincardineshire
Kinross-shire (until 1975)
Kirkcudbright
Lanarkshire
Linlithgowshire – renamed West Lothian 1921
Midlothian
Moray (known as Elgin or Elginshire until 1928)
Nairn
Orkney (from 1975)
Orkney and Shetland (until 1975)
Peeblesshire (until 1975)
Perth and Kinross (from 1975)
Perthshire (until 1975)
Renfrewshire
Ross and Cromarty (since 1890)
Ross-shire (until 1890)
Roxburgh, Ettrick and Lauderdale (since 1975)
Roxburghshire (until 1975)
Selkirkshire (until 1975)
Shetland (from 1975)
Stirling and Falkirk (from 1975)
Stirlingshire (until 1975)
Sutherland
Tweeddale (from 1975)
West Lothian (from 1921)
Western Isles (from 1975)
Wigtown

Wales
Anglesey (until 1974)
Brecknockshire (until 1974)
Caernarvonshire (until 1974)
Cardiganshire (until 1974)
Carmarthenshire (until 1974)
Carmarthen (until 1974) – held jointly with Carmarthenshire 1882–1974
Clwyd (from 1974)
Denbighshire (until 1974)
Dyfed (from 1974)
Flintshire (until 1974)
Glamorgan (until 1974)
Gwent (from 1974)
Gwynedd (from 1974)
Haverfordwest (until 1974)
Merionethshire (until 1974)
Mid Glamorgan (from 1974)
Monmouthshire (until 1974)
Montgomeryshire (until 1974)
Pembrokeshire (until 1974)
Powys (from 1974)
Radnorshire (until 1974)
South Glamorgan (from 1974)
West Glamorgan (from 1974)

Ireland
Lord Lieutenant of Ireland (until 1922)

Northern Ireland
Antrim
Armagh
Belfast (from 1899)
Down
Fermanagh
Londonderry (County)
Londonderry (County Borough) Held jointly with County Londonderry 1882–1899
Tyrone

rest of Ireland
Carlow (until 1922)
Cavan (until 1922)
Clare (until 1922)
Cork (until 1922)
Cork (County of the City) – usually held with County Cork (until 1922)
Donegal (until 1922)
Drogheda (County of the Town) (until 1899) – held jointly with County Louth 1882–1899
Dublin (until 1922)
Dublin (County of the City) (until 1922)
Galway (until 1922)
Galway (County of the Town) (until 1899) – held jointly with County Galway 1882–1899
Kerry (until 1922)
Kildare (until 1922)
Kilkenny (until 1922)
Kilkenny (County of the City) (until 1899) – jointly with County Kilkenny 1882–1899
King's County (until 1922)
Leitrim (until 1922)
Limerick (until 1922)
Limerick (County of the City) (until 1922) – usually held jointly with County Limerick
Longford (until 1922)
Louth (until 1922)
Mayo (until 1922)
Meath (until 1922)
Monaghan (until 1922)
Queen's County (until 1922)
Roscommon (until 1922)
Sligo (until 1922)
Tipperary (until 1922)
Waterford (until 1922)
Waterford (County of the City) (until 1922) – held jointly with County Waterford 1882–1922
Westmeath (until 1922)
Wexford (until 1922)
Wicklow (until 1922)

See also
Lieutenancy area

List of Shrievalties
Lists of Custodes Rotulorum
Ceremonial counties of England
Counties of Ireland
Lieutenancy areas of Scotland
Preserved counties of Wales

References

Lists of subdivisions of the United Kingdom
Local government in the United Kingdom